Wallaceton is a historic home located at Chesapeake, Virginia.  The original section was built between 1853 and 1863, as a company store. It was expanded after the American Civil War. It is a -story, rectangular, Greek Revival style frame dwelling.  It has flat corner pilasters, a heavy box cornice under the eaves, and a full width front porch.  Also on the property are a contributing two-room kitchen building and a dairy.  About 1910, it was relocated approximately 100 feet to the east of the Dismal Swamp Canal to remove it from canal property. It was named for John Gallaudet Wallace (1840-1910) a farmer and businessman who fought in the Civil War for the Confederacy, as a Captain of Company C, 61st Virginia Volunteer Infantry Regiment.

It was listed on the National Register of Historic Places in 2000.

References

Houses on the National Register of Historic Places in Virginia
Greek Revival houses in Virginia
Houses completed in 1853
Houses in Chesapeake, Virginia
National Register of Historic Places in Chesapeake, Virginia